Espenmoos Stadium, is a football stadium in St. Gallen, Switzerland.  It was the home ground of the FC St. Gallen until their current stadium Kybunpark opened in 2008.  The stadium has since been demolished except for the main seated stand.

External links
 Stadium information

Defunct football venues in Switzerland
Buildings and structures in St. Gallen (city)
Multi-purpose stadiums in Switzerland
Sport in St. Gallen (city)